The 2013 Judo Grand Slam Paris was held in Paris, France, from 9 to 10 February 2013.

Medal summary

Men's events

Women's events

Source Results

Medal table

References

External links
 

2013 IJF World Tour
2013 Judo Grand Slam
Judo
Grand Slam Paris 2013
Judo
Judo